Rhizobium viscosum is a bacterium species from the genus Rhizobium which has been isolated from soil from the city airport in Guatemala. Rhizobium viscosum produces exopolysaccharide.

Further reading

References 

Bacteria described in 1965